Charles J. A. Wilson (1880-1965) was a Scottish-born American artist, painter, etcher, and illustrator known for ship portraits and marine art.

Early life and art career 
Wilson was born in Glasgow, Scotland in 1880. At age one his family immigrated to Duluth, Minnesota. In his teens he moved to Newton, Massachusetts and taught himself the marine art, capturing the ships and scenes of Boston harbor. He worked for Bethlehem Shipbuilding Co. of East Boston etching ships from blueprints.

During the World War I, Wilson spent two years in France. After the war he was commissioned to paint and etch American ships and marine views. During the World War II, Wilson was an official U.S. Coast Guard artist.

Wilson exhibited with the Pennsylvania Academy of Fine Art in 1929, the Philadelphia Museum of Art, the Currier Gallery in 1932, the Lyman Allyn Museum in 1934, as well as the U.S. Coast Guard Academy in New London and the Library of Congress in Washington D.C.

Wilson's painting of the SS Leviathan is in the collection of the Peabody Essex Museum.

Wilson signed his works as C.J.A. Wilson.

See also 

 Marine art

References 

1880 births
1965 deaths
20th-century American painters
20th-century American male artists
American male painters
Modern painters
Artists from Glasgow
Scottish emigrants to the United States